正德 (shinjitai: 正徳) may refer to:
Masanori, Japanese masculine given name
Zhengde Emperor, 11th Ming dynasty Emperor of China, 1505–1521
Shōtoku (era), Japanese era name corresponding to April 1711 through June 1716